The 1999–2000 Scottish Premier League (known as the 1999–2000 Bank of Scotland Premier League for sponsorship reasons) was the second season of the Scottish Premier League, the top level of football in Scotland. It began in on 31 July 1999 and concluded on 21 May 2000.

Rangers, the defending champions, retained their title on 22 April 2000, after their nearest challengers Celtic drew 1–1 with Hibernian.

Teams
A total of 10 teams competed in the league, the top 9 sides from the 1998–99 Scottish Premier League and the champions of the 1998–99 Scottish First Division.

Hibernian were promoted to the league after winning the 1998–99 First Division by a 23-point margin. They replaced Dunfermline Athletic who were relegated after a three-season stint in the top flight, finishing bottom of the league the previous season.

Stadia and locations

Personnel and kits

Managerial changes

Overview 
The 1999–2000 Scottish Premier League was won by Rangers for the second successive year, finishing 21 points ahead of nearest rivals Celtic. As champions, Rangers qualified for the Champions League while Celtic and third-placed Hearts qualified for the UEFA Cup.

As the SPL was being expanded to 12 teams, there was going to be a three-way playoff between the team finishing bottom and the second and third placed teams in the First Division, but due to Falkirk's stadium (Brockville Park) having fewer than the SPL minimum required 10,000 seats, the playoff was scrapped, bottom-placed Aberdeen remained in the top flight and Dunfermline were promoted automatically as the First Division runners-up. Aberdeen appeared in both the League Cup and Scottish Cup final, but lost both to Celtic and Rangers, respectively. However, as Scottish Cup runners-up, they also qualified for the following season's UEFA Cup.

Celtic entered the season under new management with former Liverpool player John Barnes taking charge in June 1999. It proved to be a brief and unsuccessful reign, however, after being sacked in February 2000, ten points behind Rangers in the league, and in the wake of a Scottish Cup defeat to First Division Inverness Caledonian Thistle.

On 20 October 1999, Aberdeen and Motherwell played out a match which finished in a 6–5 victory for Aberdeen at Fir Park. This was the record for the highest-scoring match in Scottish Premier League history, until Motherwell and Hibernian played out a 6–6 draw in May 2010, also at Fir Park.

Rangers secured the league title on 22 April 2000, after Celtic drew 1–1 with Hibernian at Celtic Park, leaving Celtic with a 17-point deficit with only 5 matches left to play.

League table

Results

Matches 1–18
During matches 1–18 each team plays every other team twice (home and away).

Matches 19–36 
During matches 19–36 each team plays every other team a further two times (home and away).

Top scorers 

Source: SPL official website

Attendances 
The average attendances for SPL clubs during the 1999/00 season are shown below:

Source: SPL official website

References 
 Season Review - ScotPrem.co.uk

Scottish Premier League seasons
1999–2000 in Scottish football leagues
Scot